Wilfred Arnold (1903–1970), also known as C. Wilfred Arnold, was a British art director. He was prolific contributor to British films, designing the sets for more than a hundred. His brother Norman Arnold was also an art director.

Selected filmography

 The Rat (1925)
 The Sea Urchin (1926)
 The Lodger (1927)
 The Silver Lining (1927)
 The Ring (1927)
 The Farmer's Wife (1928)
 Champagne (1928)
 The First Born (1928)
 The Manxman (1929)
 Blackmail (1929)
 Under the Greenwood Tree (1929)
 Rich and Strange (1931)
 The Outsider (1931)
 Number Seventeen (1932)
 Lord of the Manor (1933)
 Sorrell and Son (1933)
 One Precious Year (1933)
 Dick Turpin (1934)
 Girls Please! (1934)
 I Spy (1934)
 Brewster's Millions (1935)
 Escape Me Never (1935)
 The Mad Hatters (1935)
 The Hope of His Side (1935)
 Talk of the Devil (1936)
 When Knights Were Bold (1936)
 Museum Mystery (1937)
 Midnight Menace (1937)
 Night Ride (1937)
 Missing, Believed Married (1937)
 Incident in Shanghai (1938)
 This Man Is News (1938)
 A Spot of Bother (1938)
 The Silent Battle (1939)
 The Saint in London (1939)
 Music Hall Parade (1939)
 An Englishman's Home (1940)
 Salute John Citizen (1942)
 We'll Meet Again (1943)
 Old Mother Riley Detective (1943)
 Theatre Royal (1943)
 The Dummy Talks (1943)
 Medal for the General (1944)
 Candles at Nine (1944)
 Meet Sexton Blake (1945)
 Twilight Hour (1945)
 The Agitator (1945)
 The Echo Murders (1945)
 Old Mother Riley at Home (1945)
 Loyal Heart (1946)
 Meet the Navy (1946)
 Appointment with Crime (1946)
 Spring Song (1946)
 Green Fingers (1947)
 The Ghosts of Berkeley Square (1947)
 The Three Weird Sisters (1948)
 Counterblast (1948)
 No Room at the Inn (1948)
 Marry Me (1949)
 The Woman with No Name (1950)
 Up for the Cup (1950)
 Old Mother Riley, Headmistress (1950)
 Worm's Eye View (1951)
 Take Me to Paris (1951)
 Reluctant Heroes (1951)
 Stolen Face (1952)
 Lady in the Fog (1952)
 The Voice of Merrill (1952)
 Little Big Shot (1952)
 Three Steps to the Gallows (1953)
 Wheel of Fate (1953)
 The Flanagan Boy (1953)
 The Steel Key (1953)
 Recoil (1953)
 Escape by Night (1953)
 Love in Pawn (1953)
 Impulse (1954)
 The Runaway Bus (1954)
 Double Exposure (1954)
 Life with the Lyons (1954)
 The Embezzler (1954)
 Delayed Action (1954)
 The Golden Link (1954)

References

Bibliography
 Ryall, Tom. Alfred Hitchcock and the British Cinema. Athlone Press, 1996.

External links

1903 births
1970 deaths
People from Ormskirk
British art directors